Pul Pehladpur is a census town in South East Delhi district of Delhi, India.

Demographics
 India Census, Pul Pehladpur had a population of 69,657. Males constitute 54.5% of the population and females 45.5%. Pul Pehladpur has an average literacy rate of 84.4%, higher than the national average of 73%: male literacy is 91.28%, and female literacy is 76.23%. In Pul Pehladpur, 13.87% of the population is under 6 years of age.

Connectivity

Road
Pul Pehladpur is connected to the whole Delhi by M.B(Mehrauli-Badarpur)road. It is also connected to Faridabad by Surajkund Road.

Metro
The nearest metro stations are Tughlakabad and Badarpur Border on Violet Line, both of which are about 1 km from Pehladpur.

Railway
The nearest railway station is Tughlakabad railway station.

References

Cities and towns in South Delhi district